Brick Church is an active commuter railroad station in the city of East Orange, Essex County, New Jersey. The station, one of two in East Orange, is located next to the Temple of Unified Christians Brick Church, designed with brick architecture. Trains from the station head east on New Jersey Transit's Morristown Line and Gladstone Branch to New York Penn Station and Hoboken Terminal while westbound trains service stops out to Gladstone and Hackettstown. Like its sister station, Brick Church contains three tracks and two platforms (a side platform and an island platform). However, it is not accessible for the handicapped. 

Railroad service through East Orange began with the opening of the Morris and Essex Railroad on November 19, 1836 to Orange. The railroad stopped at the residence of local attorney Matthias Ogden Halsted each day for him to commute. He soon provided a station for commuters to use as well as himself, and hired a family to operate it, without charging the railroad. Locals helped fund and build a new depot in 1880. The current station opened on December 18, 1922 when the railroad tracks through the city were elevated by the Delaware, Lackawanna and Western Railroad. The brick headhouse at Brick Church station were added to the New Jersey and National Registers of Historic Places in 1984 as part of the Operating Passenger Railroad Stations Thematic Resource.

History
The line that currently runs through East Orange began in 1835 with the charter of the Morris and Essex Railroad, being approved by the New Jersey State Legislature on January 29. Service through the city of East Orange began on November 19, 1836 from Newark to The Oranges. With the construction of the railroad, Matthias Ogden Halsted (1792–1866), a local property developer took advantage of the one train a day that went to Newark. The railroad dropped Halsted off at his house and picked him up at his house rather making a trip to a station. Halsted offered at no cost to build a proper station at the site of the Brick Church station, and did so for the railroad.

Station layout

The station has two low-level platforms serving all three tracks.

See also
List of New Jersey Transit stations
National Register of Historic Places listings in Essex County, New Jersey

Bibliography

References

External links

 Station House from Google Maps Street View
 Harrison Street entrance from Google Maps Street View

NJ Transit Rail Operations stations
Railway stations in the United States opened in 1836
Railway stations in Essex County, New Jersey
Railway stations on the National Register of Historic Places in New Jersey
Former Delaware, Lackawanna and Western Railroad stations
East Orange, New Jersey
1836 establishments in New Jersey